Biedma is a department located in the north east of Chubut Province, on the Atlantic coast of Argentina.  The spelling Viedma is also sometimes used, but the spelling Biedma is preferred, to distinguish the department from the city of Viedma in Río Negro Province.

The provincial subdivision has a population of about 59,000 inhabitants in an area of  12,940 km², and its capital city is Puerto Madryn, which is located around 1,334 km from Buenos Aires.

Economy

The main contributors to the economy of Biedma are tourism, fishing, farming and the production of Aluminium.

Attractions

Valdés Peninsula (World Heritage Site)

Sport

Puerto Madryn is home to two football clubs;  Club Social y Atlético Guillermo Brown, who play in Torneo Argentino A and Deportivo Madryn that currently play in Torneo Argentino B.

Settlements

Puerto Madryn 
Puerto Pirámides 
Mina Guanacache
Arroyo Verde
Puerto Lobos
Riacho San Jose

External links
Puerto Madryn Tourist Site (English)
Puerto Madryn Municipal Website (Spanish)

1865 establishments in Argentina
Departments of Chubut Province